The Finnish Transport Safety Agency,, shortened to Trafi, was a Finnish government agency responsible for the promotion of safety in the Finnish transport system. It was overseen by the Finland's Ministry of Transport and Communications. On 1 January 2019 it was merged with the Finnish Communications Regulatory Authority and parts of the Finnish Transport Agency to form the Finnish Transport and Communications Agency Traficom.

References

External links 
 

Government agencies of Finland